The Boules event at the 2022 Mediterranean Games was held in Es Sénia, Algeria, from 26 to 29 June 2022. Athletes competed in 9 events across 3 disciplines: lyonnaise, pétanque and raffa.

Medal table

Medal summary

Lyonnaise

Pétanque

Raffa

References

External links
Official site
Results book

Sports at the 2022 Mediterranean Games
2022
Mediterranean Games